MacGruber was a recurring sketch on the NBC television series Saturday Night Live, first appearing on the show in January 2007. The sketch is a parody of the 1985–1992 adventure series MacGyver.  The sketch stars Will Forte as special operations agent MacGruber, who is tasked in each episode with deactivating a ticking bomb but becomes distracted by personal issues, resulting in the bomb's detonation and (presumably) the deaths of his companions and himself.

MacGrubers popularity has led to a film based on the character, which was released on May 21, 2010. A television series for the streaming service Peacock premiered on December 16, 2021.

Creation
The character of MacGruber was created by SNL writer Jorma Taccone. The sketches are written by Forte, Taccone and John Solomon and directed by Taccone, except for the March 2008 and May 2008 installments, which were directed by Solomon.

Premise
In the sketch's first appearance of each SNL episode, MacGruber finds himself and his assistants trapped in a control room with a ticking time bomb. MacGruber's female assistant (played in 2007 by Maya Rudolph and later by Kristen Wiig) and another assistant (usually played by that week's SNL host) "recap" their situation, explaining that they are in an abandoned mine, abandoned factory, or other adventure-type setting (it is a running gag that they are always locked in the control room, no matter how illogical the idea of a control room is in the context of the location where they are trapped), and that the bomb will detonate in about 15–20 seconds. As he attempts to deactivate the bomb, MacGruber calls for people to pass him ordinary objects such as rubber bands or bubble gum wrappers (a reference to the sorts of objects typically used by MacGyver in devising a way out of a jam), but MacGruber inevitably loses focus before finishing the job and the bomb explodes, ending the sketch. The replacement of his female assistant from Maya Rudolph's character to Kristen Wiig's is explained in the film adaptation of the sketch.

The sketch typically reappears for a second or third installment later in the episode, with the characters appearing none the worse for wear but MacGruber growing increasingly unhinged and his assistants becoming more disillusioned in his capabilities. Each installment ends with the bomb's detonation.

Family
MacGruber's father is the famed Angus MacGyver (Richard Dean Anderson), making his full name MacGruber MacGyver. His grandmother is portrayed by Betty White, who becomes his fiancée in her appearance. MacGruber also has an estranged homosexual son (Shia LaBeouf), whom he sends to a camp to become heterosexual over a three-sketch arc. He also has an older half-brother named Khaluber (The Great Khali) who does not speak English.

Themes
The personal issues that have distracted MacGruber and prevented him from stopping the bomb include alcoholism (Molly Shannon/Linkin Park episode), his son's homosexuality (Shia LaBeouf/My Morning Jacket episode), losing his savings due to the current economic crisis (Josh Brolin/Adele episode), discovering his long-lost father (Dwayne Johnson/Ray LaMontagne episode), his addiction to plastic surgery (Seth Rogen/Spoon episode), accusing his coworkers of talking about him behind his back (Jonah Hill/Mariah Carey episode), his grandmother telling embarrassing stories from his childhood (Betty White/Jay-Z episode), his racism (Charles Barkley/Alicia Keys episode), and his belief in COVID-19 misinformation (Will Forte/Måneskin episode).

MacGyver/Pepsi cross-over
During the January 31, 2009, episode of SNL, MacGyver star Richard Dean Anderson appeared with Forte in three Pepsi commercials designed to resemble MacGruber sketches. In the commercials, MacGyver complains about the poor job MacGruber is doing and accuses him of being a sellout. The commercials were later included as part of the SNL episode on Hulu.

In the second commercial, later re-aired during Super Bowl XLIII, MacGruber and MacGyver are locked in the control room of an "illegal supply ship", where MacGruber becomes distracted by the temptation of Pepsi and announces he has changed his name to "Pepsuber." In the third commercial, the MacGruber theme song lyrics and MacGruber's dialogue have been replaced by the single word "Pepsi" repeated over and over and over. When his companions finally get fed up with this and ask if he can say anything but Pepsi, MacGruber holds up a Diet Pepsi, but is only able to say "Diet Pep-" before the control room explodes, and the commercial ends.

Anderson returned to SNL on the March 7, 2009, episode, in which it was revealed that MacGyver is actually MacGruber's long-lost father (making the latter's full name "MacGruber MacGyver"), who left his mother (Abby Elliott) for a stripper named Lacey when MacGruber was a baby.

List of MacGruber sketches and characters

 The second part of installment also featured cast member Kristen Wiig as Taylor, MacGruber's new girlfriend.
 This installment also featured cast member Bill Hader as MacGruber's life coach (though the third part of this "MacGruber" installment never aired on TV and was, instead, put on NBC.com's Saturday Night Live video page).
 The third part of this installment also featured cast member Andy Samberg as Scott, Merrill's secret boyfriend. 
 The first and second parts of this installment also featured cast member Abby Elliott as MacGruber's mother and Michaela Watkins as MacGyver's assistant.

Feature film

On the June 1, 2009 episode of Late Night with Jimmy Fallon, Forte confirmed that a MacGruber film was being written by him, Taccone, and Solomon. The film stars Forte, Wiig, Val Kilmer, and Ryan Phillippe. The film was released on May 21, 2010, after being pushed back from April 23, 2010.

The film stirred up controversy with Lee Zlotoff, creator of the TV series MacGyver, whose contract stipulates he retained the right to a film version of the TV series which inspired the parody sketches. Zlotoff's lawyer sent several cease-and-desist letters and continued to meet with litigators to determine a course of action. , no suit has been brought.

Television series

In January 2020, it was announced that a television series is in development. Will Forte will reprise his role as well as executive produce the series with John Solomon and Jorma Taccone the latter of whom will direct the series. The show is being developed for NBCUniversal's streaming service Peacock. On August 10, 2020, it was announced that the production had been given a series order.
In June 2021, Sam Elliott, Laurence Fishburne and Mickey Rourke joined the cast. The series  premiered on December 16, 2021.

See also
 Recurring Saturday Night Live characters and sketches

References

MacGyver (1985 TV series)
Saturday Night Live sketches
Saturday Night Live in the 2000s
Television characters introduced in 2007
Parodies of television shows